Nagarhalli is a village in Dharwad district of Karnataka, India.

Demographics 
As of the 2011 Census of India there were 213 households in Nagarhalli and a total population of 1,070 consisting of 551 males and 519 females. There were 115 children ages 0-6.

References

Villages in Dharwad district